Augusto Ramos Soares (born 22 August 1986 in Baucau, Timor Timur, Indonesia) is an East Timorese long distance runner. He represented his country in the marathon event at the 2012 Summer Olympics in London, finishing in 84th place.  He was also East Timor's flag-bearer at the 2012 Games.

He was inspired to run by a visit to his school by Aguida Amaral, East Timor's first Olympic athlete. His pre-Olympic personal best was 2:30:04.  He qualified for the 2008 Summer Olympics but did not participate.  He came second at the Dili Marathon in 2010 and 2011.

He competed for East Timor at the 2016 Summer Olympics in the men's 1500 metres event. He finished 12th in his heat and did not qualify for the semifinals. However, he did run a personal best with a time of 4:11.35. He was the flag bearer for East Timor during the closing ceremony.

References

External links
 

1986 births
Living people
People from Baucau District
East Timorese male long-distance runners
Olympic athletes of East Timor
Athletes (track and field) at the 2012 Summer Olympics
Athletes (track and field) at the 2016 Summer Olympics
East Timorese male marathon runners